Kinemacolor was the first successful colour motion picture process, used commercially from 1908 to 1914. It was invented by George Albert Smith  in 1906. He was influenced by the work of William Norman Lascelles Davidson and, more directly, Edward Raymond Turner. It was launched by Charles Urban's Urban Trading Co. of London in 1908. From 1909 on, the process was known and trademarked as Kinemacolor. It was a two-colour additive colour process, photographing and projecting a black-and-white film behind alternating red and green filters.

Process

"How to Make and Operate Moving Pictures" published by Funk & Wagnalls in 1917 notes the following:

Premiere

The first motion picture exhibited in Kinemacolor was an eight-minute short filmed in Brighton titled A Visit to the Seaside, which was trade shown in September 1908. On 26 February 1909, the general public first saw Kinemacolor in a programme of twenty-one short films shown at the Palace Theatre in London.  The process was first seen in the United States on 11 December 1909, at an exhibition staged by Smith and Urban at Madison Square Garden in New York City.

In 1911, Kinemacolor released the first dramatic film made in the process, Checkmated. The company then produced the documentary films With Our King and Queen Through India (also known as The Durbar at Delhi, 1912), and the notable recovery of £750,000 worth of gold and silver bullion from the wreck of P&O's SS Oceana in the Strait of Dover (1912). With Our King and Queen Through India and the dramas The World, the Flesh and the Devil (1914), and Little Lord Fauntleroy (1914) were the first three feature films made in colour. These latter two features were also among the last films released by Kinemacolor.

Success and decline
Kinemacolor enjoyed the most commercial success in the UK where, between 1909 and 1918, it was shown at more than 250 entertainment venues. The system was made available to exhibitors  either by licence or from 1913 through a series of touring companies. Although in most cases the system stayed at licensed venues for only a few months there were instances where it remained at a hall for up to two years. 54 dramatic films were produced. Four dramatic short films were also produced by Kinemacolor in the United States in 1912 and 1913, and one in Japan, Yoshitsune Senbon Zakura (1914).

However, the company was never a success, partly due to the expense of installing special Kinemacolor projectors in cinemas. Also, the process suffered from "fringeing" and "haloing" of the images, an unsolvable problem as long as Kinemacolor remained a successive frame process. Kinemacolor in the U.S. became most notable for its Hollywood studio being taken over by D. W. Griffith, who also took over Kinemacolor's uncompleted project to film Thomas Dixon's The Clansman, which eventually became The Birth of a Nation (1915). The 1 reels shot in Kinemacolor are lost, and the finished film is entirely in black-and-white.

The first (additive) version of Prizma Color, developed by William Van Doren Kelley in the U.S. from 1913 to 1917, used some of the same principles as Kinemacolor. In the UK, William Friese-Greene developed another additive colour system for film called Biocolour. However, in 1914 George Albert Smith sued Friese-Greene for infringing Kinemacolor's patents, slowing the development of Biocolour by Friese-Greene and his son Claude in the 1920s.

Predecessor process
In 2012, the National Media Museum in Bradford, England publicized its digital restoration of some very early three-colour alternating-filter test films, dated to 1902, made by Edward Raymond Turner. They are believed to be the earliest existing colour film footage. Turner's process, for which Charles Urban had provided financial backing, was adapted by Smith after Turner's sudden death in 1903, and this in turn became Kinemacolor.

List of films made in Kinemacolor

The Adopted Child (1911)
"Advance Styles of Ostrich Plumage" (1911)
Aldershot Views (1912) 
All's Well That Ends Well (1914)
Alpes-Maritimes — Cascade de Courmes (1912)
The Alps (1913)
An American Invasion (1913)
The Amorous Doctor (1911) 
Artillery Drill at West Point (1910)
Atlantic City (1912)
The Baby (1910)
A Balkan Episode (1911) 
Band of Queen's Highlanders (1909)
"Barnyard Pets" (1910)
"Beads of the World" (1911)
Big Waves at Brighton (1912)
"The Birth of a Flower" (1910)
The Birth of a Nation (1911, uncompleted)
Biskra and the Sahara Desert (1910) 
The Blackmailer (1911) 
Boys Will Be Boys (1911)
"Britain Prepared" (1915) 
Brown's German Liver Cure (1911) 
The Bully (1910) 
The Burglar as Father Christmas (1911) 
Burial of the Maine (1912)
Butterflies (1913)
By Order of Napoleon (1910)
By the Side of the Zuyder Zee (1912)
Caesar's Prisoners (1911) 
Cairo and the Nile (1912)
The Call of the Blood (1913) 
The Cap of Invisibility (1912) 
Carnival at Nice (1914)
Carnival in Ceylon (1913)
Carnival Scenes at Nice and Cannes (1909)
Cart Horse Parade-May 31-Regent's Park (1912)
Castles in the Air (1912)
Cat Studies (1908)
Charles Barnold's Dog and Monkey (1912)
Checkmated (1911)
"The Chef’s Preparations" (1910) 
Children Forming United States Flag at Albany Capitol (1912)
Children's Battle of Flowers at Nice (1909)
"Choice Bouquets" (1910)
Choosing the Wallpaper (1910)
A Christmas Spirit (1912) 
Church Parade of the 7th Hussars and 16th Lancers (1909)
A Cingalese Fishing Village in Ceylon (1913)
A Citizeness of Paris (1911) 
The Clown's Sacrifice (1911) 
Coney Gets the Glad Eye (1913)
Coney as a Peacemaker (1913)
Coronation of George V (1911)
The Coster's Wedding (1910)
The Crusader (1911)
Dandy Dick of Bishopsgate (1911)
"A Day at Henley" (1911)
A Detachment of Gordon Highlanders (1909)
Detective Henry and the Paris Apaches (1911)
A Devoted Friend (1911) 
Dr. Jekyll and Mr. Hyde (1913 British)
Egypt (1910)
Elevating an Elephant (1913) 
An Elizabethan Romance (1912)
Entertaining Auntie (1913) 
Esther: A Biblical Episode (1911)
The Explorers (1913) 
The Fall of Babylon (1911) 
Farm Yard Friends (1910)
Fate (1911)
"Feeding Poultry at Prowse Jones Farm" (1911) 
Fifty Miles from Tombstone (1913) 
The Fisherman's Daughter (1911) 
Floral Fiends (1910)
The Flower Girl of Florence (1911) 
Following Mother's Footsteps (1911) 
For the Crown (1911)
"Forces of Europe" (1914)
"Fording the River" (1910) 
A French Duel (1911)
"The Freshwater Aquarium" (1911) 
From Bud to Blossom (1910)
From Factory Girl to Prima Donna (1911)
The Funeral of Edward VII (1910) 
Galileo (1911) 
A Gambler's Villainy (1912) 
Ganges at Benares (1913)
"Gems and Jewels" (1911)
The General's Only Son (1911)
George V's Visit to Ireland (1911) 
Gerald's Butterfly (1912) 
Girl Worth Having (1913)
Gladioli (1913)
Grape vineyards in Piedmont, Italy (1914)
"The Harvest" (1908)
Haunted Otter (1913)
Hiawatha (1913)
A Highland Lassie (1910)
The Highlander (1911)
His Brother's Keeper (1913)
His Conscience (1911) 
His Last Burglary (1911) 
The House That Jack Built (1913)
How to Live 100 Years (1913) 
The Hypnotist and the Convict (1911) 
Ice Cutting on the St. Lawrence River (1912) 
In Gollywog Land (1912)
In the Reign of Terror (1911) 
Inaugurazione del Campanile di San Marco, Venice (1912)
Incident on Brighton Beach (1909)
Indiens sur le terrain M. A. A. A. (1910)
The Inventor's Son (1911) 
The Investiture of the Prince of Wales at Caernarvon (1911)
Italian Flower and Bead Vendors (1912)
Italy (1910)
Jack and the Beanstalk (1912) 
Jane Shore (1911)
Japan (1913) 
Johnson at the Wedding (1911) 
Julius Caesar's Sandals (1911)
"Khartoum and his Natives" (1911) 
Kinemacolor Fashion Gazette (1913)
Kinemacolor Panama Pictures (1913)
Kinemacolor Photo Plays (1913)
Kinemacolor Puzzle (1909)
Kinemacolor Songs (1911) 
The King and Queen on Their Way to Open the Victoria and Albert Museum (1912)
The King of Indigo (1911) 
Kitty the Dressmaker (1911) 
Lady Beaulay's Necklace (1911) 
Lake Garda Northern Italy (1910)
Launch of the S.S. Olympic (1912)
The Letter (1909)
Liquors and Cigars (1910)
The Little Daughter's Letter (1911) 
Little Lady Lafayette (1911) 
Little Lord Fauntleroy (1914) 
The Little Picture Producer (1914)
The Little Wooden Soldier (1912) 
The London Fire Brigade (1910)
London Zoological Gardens (1910)
Lost Collar Stud (1914) 
The Lost Ring (1911) 
Love and War in Toyland (1913)
Love Conquers (1911) 
Love in a Cottage (1911)
Love of Riches (1911) 
Love Story of Charles II (1911)

Love's Strategy (1911) 
A Lucky Escape (1911) 
The Lust for Gold (1912) 
Magic Ring (1911) 
The Making of the Panama Canal (1912)
"Man's Best Friends" (1911)
The Marble Industry at Carrara Italy (1913)
"Mephisto" (1912)
A Merry Monarch (1913)
The Mighty Dollar (1912) 
The Millionaire's Nephew (1911) 
The Minstrel King (1912)
Miscellaneous Flowers (1914) 
Mischievous Puck (1911) 
Mission Bells (1913) 
Modelling Extraordinary (1912) 
A Modern Hero (1911) 
The Modern Pygmalion and Galatea (1911)
Motor and Yacht Boating in England (1910)
Music Hath Charms (1911) 
Mystic Manipulations (1911) 
A Narrow Escape (1913)
Nathan Hale (1913)
Natural Color Portraiture (1909) 
Naval Review at Spithead (1910)
Nell Gwynn the Orange Girl (1911)
"New York Autumn Fashions" (1912)
"Niagara Falls" (1912) 
Nobility (1912)
A Noble Heart (1911)
Normal Melbourne (1912)
Nubia, Wadi Halfa and the Second Cataract (1911)
Oedipus Rex (1911) 
Ofia, the Woman Spy (1912) 
The Old Guitar (1912) 
The Old Hat (1910) 
Oliver Cromwell (1911) 
Only a Woman (1912) 
Other People's Children (1913)
"Out Gem of a Cook" (1910)
Pageant of New Romney, Hythe, and Sandwich (1910)
Pagsanjan Falls (1911) 
Paris Fashions (1913)
The Passions of an Egyptian Princess (1911) 
The Peasants and the Fairy (1911) 
Performing Elephants (1913)
Phil Rees' Stable Lads (1912)
Picking Strawberries (1910)
Pisa Italy (1913)
Pompeii (1912)
Potomac Falls Virginia (1910)
The Power of Prayer (1913)
The Priest's Burden (1911) 
The Princess of Romana (1913)
The Rabbits-Sheep-Carrots for the Donkey (1909)
Rambles in Paris (1913)
Reaping (1909)
The Rebel's Daughter (1911)
"Refreshments" (1910)
Representatives of the British Isles (1909) 
Reptiles (1912) 
Review of Troops by George V (1910) 
Revues des Boy Scouts a Montreal (1910)
The Richmond Horse Show (1910)
The Rivals (1913) 
Riviera Coast Scenes (1909)
Riviera Fisher Folk (1909)
Robin Hood (1913)
A Romance of the Canadian Wilds (1910)
Romani the Brigand (1912) 
Royal Ascot (1912)
A Run with the Exmoor Staghounds (1912)
Sailing and Motor Boat Scenes at Southwick (1909)
Samson and Delilah (1911) 
Santa Claus (1913)
Saved From the Titanic (1912) (only two scenes were filmed in Kinemacolor)
The Scarlet Letter (1913) 
Scenes a Montreal comprenant le Gymkhana (1910)
Scenes in Algeria (1910)
"Scenes in Cornwall" (1910)
Scenes on the Mediterranean (1913)
A Scrap of Paper (1913)
A Seaside Comedy (1912) 
The Silken Thread (1911) 
Simpkin's Dream of a Holiday (1911) 
Small Game at the Zoo (1912)
"The Smallest Barque in the World" (1911)
Soldiers' Pet (1909)
Spreewald (1913)
St. John the Baptist (1912)
Stage Struck (1913)
Steam (1910)
"The Story of Napoleon" (1910)
The Story of the Orange (1913)
The Story of the Wasp (1914)
Strange Mounts (1912)
Suffragette's Parade in Washington, D.C. (1913)
The Sugar Industry of Jamaica (1913)
Sunset on the Nile (1913)
"Sunsets of Egypt" (1912) 
Swank and the Remedy (1911) 
Swans (1909)
Sweet Flowers (1909)
Tartans of Scottish Clans (1906)
Telemachus (1911) 
Three Cape Girls (1912)
The Tide of Fortune (1912) 
Theodore Roosevelt (1912)
There Is a God (1913)
Tobogganing in Switzerland (1913)
La Tosca (1911) with Lillian Russell based on the play by Victorien Sardou
A Tragedy of the Olden Times (1911)
Trilby and Svengali (1911) 
A Trip Up Mount Lowe USA (1913)
A True Briton (1912) 
Two Can Play at the Same Game (1911) 
The Two Chorus Girls (1911) 
Two Christmas Hampers (1911) 
Two Clowns (1906)
The Two Rivals (1912) 
Uncle's Picnic (1911) 
The Unveiling of the Queen Victoria Memorial (1911)
The Vandal Outlaws (1912)
"Varieties of Sweet Peas" (1911) 
Venice and the Grand Canal (1910)
The Vicissitudes of a Top Hat (1912) 
View of Brighton Front (1909)
A Visit to Aldershot (1909)
A Visit to the Seaside (1908)
Visite de son Altesse Royale le Duc de Connaught a Montreal (1910)
Voyage de Liverpool a Vancouver via Montreal (1910)
Washington's Home and Grounds at Mount Vernon (1910)
Water Carnival at Villefranche-sur-Mer (1909)
Waves and Spray (1909)
William Howard Taft (1912)
William Tell (1914)
Winter in Moscow (1913)
Winter Sports at Are (1913)
With Our King and Queen Through India (The Durbar at Delhi) (1912)
"With the Fighting Forces of Europe" (1914) 
The Wizard and the Brigands (1911) 
Woman Draped in Patterned Handkerchiefs (1908)
The World, the Flesh and the Devil (1914) 
Yoshitsune Senbon Zakura (Japan, 1914)
An Expression (Japan, 1935)

See also
List of color film systems
List of film formats

References

External links
Kinemacolor on Timeline of Historical Film Colors, with primary and secondary sources, patents, and photographs of historical film prints.
Re-creating Kinemacolor on the screen
Kinemacolor frames of William Howard Taft.
Kinematograph Apparatus for the Production of Colored Pictures, by George Albert Smith, U.S. patent, filed 1907.
Improvements in, and relating to, Kinematograph Apparatus for the Production of Coloured Pictures British patent 26,607 accepted 25 July 1907 cancelled 26 April 1915
 "My Impressions of 'Kinemacolor'", Wilson's Photographic Magazine, 1912.
 "Animation in Natural Colours", Moving Pictures, 1912.

Audiovisual introductions in 1908
History of film
Motion picture film formats
Film and video technology
Articles containing video clips